Yuraq Q'asa or Yuraqq'asa (Quechua yuraq white, q'asa mountain pass, "white mountain pass", Hispanicized spelling Yurac Jasa) is a mountain in the Willkanuta mountain range in the Andes of Peru, about  high. It is located in the Puno Region, Melgar Province, in the Nuñoa District, near a place named Pumanuta.

References

Mountains of Peru
Mountains of Puno Region